The Swedish Volunteer Corps during the Winter War numbered 9,640 officers and men. Sweden was officially non-belligerent during the war, so the Corps was used by Finland. The Swedish volunteers were in the front lines in the northern Salla area starting from February 28, 1940. Their losses included 33 dead, 10 missing, 50 wounded, and 130 disabled by frostbite. There were also 25 aircraft that served in the Swedish Voluntary Air Force, F19. Swedish volunteers also defended Turku in an anti-aircraft battery.

By the end of the war, the Volunteer Corps was composed of 8,260 Swedes, plus 725 Norwegians, and 600 Danes. They demonstrated a strong Nordic unity that was symbolized in their "four brother hands" insignia which represented Finland, Sweden, Norway, and Denmark.

Commanders
1940: General Ernst Linder

Organization
Swedish Volunteer Corps - Svenska Frivilligkåren

 I. stridsgruppen (Lieutenant-Colonel Magnus Dyrssen, Captain Carl C:son Bonde, Lieutenant-Colonel Carl-Oscar Agell)
 1. skyttekompaniet
 2. skyttekompaniet
 3. skyttekompaniet
 4. jägarkompaniet
 5. tunga kompaniet
 1. batteriet
 1. plogplutonen
 1. signalplutonen
 II. stridsgruppen (Lieutenant-Colonel Viking Tamm)
 1. skyttekompaniet
 2. skyttekompaniet
 3. skyttekompaniet
 4. jägarkompaniet
 5. tunga kompaniet
 2. batteriet
 2. plogplutonen
 2. signalplutonen
 III. stridsgruppen (Lieutenant-Colonel Martin Ekström)
 1. skyttekompaniet
 2. skyttekompaniet
 3. skyttekompaniet
 4. jägarkompaniet
 5. tunga kompaniet
 3. batteriet
 3. plogplutonen
 3. signalplutonen
Other units:
1. pansarvärnsplutonen
2. pansarvärnsplutonen
Luftvärnskompaniet
Ingenjörkompaniet
16. självständiga jägarkompaniet
(17. självständiga jägarkompaniet)
Intendenturkompaniet
Vägkompaniet
1. bilkompaniet
2. bilkompaniet
Anspannskompaniet
1. sjukvårdsplutonen
2. sjukvårdsplutonen
Hästambulans
Ambulans
F 19

Weapons
7.5 cm Guns M/02
40mm Anti Aircraft Guns M/36
7.5 cm Anti Aircraft guns
20mm Automatic Cannons
3.7 cm Anti Tank guns M/38
8 cm Mortars M/29
13mm Anti Tank Rifles

Vehicles
83 motorcycles
83 cars
350 trucks
13 tractors

Casualties
33 men of the Swedish Volunteer Corps were killed. These were:

See also 

Sweden and the Winter War
Swedish Volunteer Battalion

Footnotes

References

External links 
Volunteers in the Winter War
Volunteer Swedish aviators in the Winter War
Swedish language site of the Swedish Volunteer organization

Winter War
Volunteers in the Winter War
Military units and formations of Finland in World War II
Military history of Sweden
Military units and formations of Sweden
Expatriate military units and formations
Soviet Union–Sweden relations
Corps of Sweden
Danish expatriates in Finland
Norwegian expatriates in Finland
Swedish expatriates in Finland